Asociación Deportiva Isidro Metapán is a Salvadoran professional football club based in Metapán. The club was founded as Isidro Menendez in  1950 but became Isidro Metapan in 2000.

List of players

Appearances and goals are for first-team competitive matches only, including domestic league (Primera División),  CONCACAF competition (CONCACAF Champions League), and UNCAF competition (Copa Interclubes UNCAF)  matches
Players are listed according to the date of their first team debut for the club.

Statistics correct as of match played 20 December 2014

Table headers
 Nationality – If a player played international football, the country/countries he played for are shown. Otherwise, the player's nationality is given as their country of birth.
 Metapan career – The year of the player's first appearance for Metapan to the year of his last appearance.
 Bold represents current players.

A.D. Isidro Metapán footballers
A.D. Isidro Metapan players
Association football player non-biographical articles
Metapan